Now Sicily (Ora Sicilia) was a regional Italian political party based in Sicily.

The party, which functioned mainly as a group within the Sicilian Regional Assembly (ARS), was launched in June 2019 by splinters from Forza Italia led by Luigi Genovese. Originally formed by three regional deputies, a month later the party was joined by Tony Rizzotto from the League. In July 2020 Now Sicily became a full-fledged party.

On 14 August 2022, Now Sicily merged ito the Movement for Autonomy and Luigi Genovese was a candidate for the "Populars and Autonomists" list in the 2022 Sicilian regional election.

References

External links
Official page – Sicilian Regional Assembly

2019 establishments in Italy
Political parties in Sicily
Political parties established in 2019